The small Samoan flying fox (Pteropus allenorum) is a species of fruit-eating megabat whose type specimen was originally collected in Samoa in 1856, but was not identified as a new species until 2009. Its wingspan was at least two feet, and it weighed around 8 oz. As the type specimen is dead, and no other examples of the species are known, it is believed to be extinct.

References

Pteropus
Mammals described in 2009
Mammal extinctions since 1500